Philip W. Berk (born February 13, 1933) is an American former film industry executive, journalist, and film critic. Berk served for eight years as president of the Hollywood Foreign Press Association and served as an influential member of the organization for several decades, during which time he was the subject of numerous controversies, including being accused of sexual assault and racism.

Early life and family 
Philip Woolf Berk was born to a Jewish family on February 13, 1933, in Cape Town, South Africa.

In 1955, Berk graduated from the University of California, Los Angeles School of Theater, Film and Television with a Bachelor of Arts degree. In 1954, Berk married Ruth Greenberg, and they have four children.

Career 
Berk worked as a journalist and produced international events as a freelancer. He worked as a writer for publications in Malaysia and South Africa, and was the film critic of the B'nai B'rith Messenger, a Jewish newspaper. In the 1990s, Berk served as secretary of the Los Angeles Film Critics Association.

Berk was a member of the Hollywood Foreign Press Association for 44 years and served terms as the organization's president and treasurer.

Controversies

Memoir 
In 2014, Berk angered members of the Hollywood Foreign Press after he published a memoir titled, With Signs and Wonders - My Journey from Darkest Africa to the Bright Lights of Hollywood, which detailed the inner workings of the organization and told stories of some of his colleagues. After the book was published, Berk took a six-month leave of absence from the organization.

Brendan Fraser sexual assault accusation 
In 2018, actor Brendan Fraser accused Berk of groping his genitals after a luncheon in 2003. The Hollywood Foreign Press Association commissioned an internal investigation, which concluded that while "Berk inappropriately touched Mr. Fraser, the evidence supports that it was intended to be taken as a joke and not as a sexual advance.” Officials asked Fraser to sign a joint statement about the matter but would not share the complete findings with him. Several publications and social media users interpreted that Fraser was blacklisted from Hollywood because of his accusation against Berk, which Berk denied. After returning to acting in The Whale in 2022, Fraser declined to attend the 2023 Golden Globe Awards ceremony due to a lack of reconciliation or apology regarding his assault accusations. Berk has described Fraser's account as a "total fabrication"; in his 2014 memoir, he admitted to having groped Fraser "in jest".

Email and expulsion 
In 2021, the board of the Hollywood Foreign Press Association permanently expelled Berk as a member of the organization after he sent an email to other members where he quoted an article that described Black Lives Matter as a "racist hate movement" and referred to Patrisse Cullors as a "self-proclaimed trained Marxist." After Berk sent the email, NBC called for Berk's immediate expulsion from the organization to move forward with the Golden Globes. After Berk's removal from the organization, the board stated that it "condemn[ed] all forms of racism, discrimination and hate speech and finds such language and content unacceptable."

References 

1933 births
Living people
People from Cape Town
American film critics
South African film critics
Jewish American journalists